Mills Lake is a California waterbody along the Sierra Crest east of Ruby Peak and Mount Mills near Little Lakes Valley.  The discharge of Mills Lake flows through Ruby Lake, Rock Creek Lake, and into Rock Creek.

See also
List of lakes in California

References

Lakes of Inyo County, California
Lakes of California
Lakes of Northern California